The Central Bank of Cyprus, is the central bank of the Republic of Cyprus, located in Nicosia. It was established in 1963. Its current Governor is Constantinos Herodotou The bank issued Cypriot pound banknotes and coins prior to 2008, when Cyprus adopted the euro.

History

The Central Bank of Cyprus has its origins in the British Colonial Government of Cyprus, which established a Cyprus Currency Board in 1927. This followed on from the unilateral annexation of Cyprus by the British Empire in 1914, the Treaty of Lausanne, establishing the legality in international law of this British takeover, in 1923, and the full establishment of a colonial system of government in Cyprus, with the creation of a Legislative Council, in 1926.

The role of the Chairman of the Currency Board was held by the Accountant General, also known as the Auditor General, of the Government of Cyprus. The Board could issue notes and coins, initially denominated in the Cypriot pound, shillings and piastres, and later, following decimalization, in Cyprus pounds and mils. However, the local currency was pegged at one Cyprus pound to one pound sterling meaning ultimate fiscal control still rested with the Bank of England in London and the Government of the United Kingdom. This link was maintained by the requirement that for every Cyprus pound issued by the Currency Board in Cyprus, one pound sterling issued by the Bank of England had to be deposited by the Government of Cyprus with the Crown Agents in London.

With independence from Britain in 1960, Article 118 of the Constitution of the Republic of Cyprus, which came into force on the island on 1 April 1960, gave the President and Vice-President of Cyprus the right to establish a new central bank, called in the Constitution the 'Issuing Bank' and appoint its Governor. Article 119 sets out the responsibilities of the Governor and the Issuing Bank, Article 120 states that the Governor of the Issuing Bank shall abide by future relevant laws enacted by the Republic of Cyprus, and Article 121 gives the Government of the Republic of Cyprus the right to convert the Issuing Bank into a Central Bank if it wishes. In effect, the Issuing Bank was a continuation of the former colonial Currency Board within the framework of the Constitution of the new Republic, but the Constitution gave the right to the Republic to convert it into a Central Bank if it chose to do so. A decision to do this was taken in 1963, and the Issuing Bank was replaced that year by the Central Bank of Cyprus.

Following the accession of the Republic of Cyprus to the European Union in 2004, the Central Bank of Cyprus became a member of the Eurozone group of central banks in 2008, when the island converted from using the Cyprus pound to the euro currency.

Role of the Governor of the Central Bank of Cyprus

The Governor of the Central Bank of Cyprus is the highest official in the Central Bank of Cyprus and is appointed by the President of the Republic. The position was established in 1963 when the Central Bank of Cyprus was established. The convention is for the Governor to serve a term of five years, but this is renewable.

The Governor has the responsibility of chairing the meetings of the Central Bank's Governing Council and Board of Directors. He or she had the responsibility for setting the Central Bank's policy in relation to the Cypriot economy, but this responsibility passed to the President of the European Central Bank on 1 January 2008, which is also the date that Cyprus changed over to the euro from the Cypriot pound. The Governor is a member of the Governing Board of the European Central Bank.

List of the Central Bank of Cyprus Governors
 Constantinos Herodotou (April 2019 – current)
 Chrystalla Georghadji (April 2014 – 2019)
 Panicos O. Demetriades (May 2012 – April 2014)
 Athanasios Orphanides (May 2007 – May 2012)
 Christodoulos Christodoulou (May 2002 – May 2007)
 Afxentis Afxentiou (May 1982 – April 2002)
 Christakis Stephani (October 1965 – April 1982)
 Charis Gavrielides (July 1963 – October 1965)
Source:

See also

 Cypriot pound
 Economy of Cyprus
 List of banks in Cyprus

References

External links

 

Financial regulatory authorities of Cyprus
Cyprus
Cyprus
Banks of Cyprus
1963 establishments in Cyprus
Banks established in 1963